Mugu District, a part of Karnali Province, is one of the seventy-seven districts of Nepal. Mugu is known for being both the most remote district in Nepal, as well as the least developed.

Geography and climate
Mugu's geography is very rugged. The biggest lake in Nepal, Rara Lake, also known as Mahendra Daha, lies in Mugu District. It is one of the biggest districts of Nepal.

Pulu is one of the more well-known villages of the Mugu district. Formerly, Pulu was a village development committee (VDC), which were local-level administrative units. In 2017, the government of Nepal restructured local government in line with the 2015 constitution and VDCs were discontinued.
Similarly, Seri is another prominent village of the district, which was also a VDC prior to the new arrangements for local administration. There are several other villages nearby, including Riusa, Mooh, Mangri, Serog, and Dawra.

Tourism 
The remote Mugu district is rich in natural resources. Nepal's largest Rara Lake lies in this district. Many domestic and international tourists come to visit the famous and beautiful Rara Lake. The lake is also known as the Mahendra Tal. The Rara National Park protects and surrounds it.Mugu is known as underdeveloped district of Neppal.

Demographics
At the time of the 2011 Nepal census, Mugu District had a population of 55,286. Of these, 92.4% spoke Nepali, 6.7% Tamang, 0.8% Sherpa and 0.1% other languages as their first language.

In terms of ethnicity/caste, 48.9% were Chhetri, 15.4% Thakuri, 9.5% Kami, 7.9% Tamang, 5.9% other Dalit, 5.2% Hill Brahmin, 3.2% Damai/Dholi, 1.3% Sanyasi/Dasnami, 0.9% Sarki, 0.6% Bhote, 0.3% Kumal, 0.2% Lohar, 0.2% Newar, 0.1% Badi, 0.1% other Terai and 0.2% others.

In terms of religion, 91.6% were Hindu, 8.1% Buddhist, 0.2% Christian and 0.1% others.

In terms of literacy, 50.8% could read and write, 4.7% could only read and 44.4% could neither read nor write.

Administration
The district consists of four municipalities, out of which all are rural municipalities. These are as follows:
Chhayanath Rara Municipality
 Mugum Karmarong Rural Municipality
 Soru Rural Municipality
 Khatyad Rural Municipality

Former village development committees 
Prior to the restructuring of the district, Mugu District consisted of the following municipalities and village development committees:

Bhiyi
Dhainakot 
Dolphu
Jima
Gamtha
Hyanglu
Jima
Kale
Karkibada
Kimri 
Kotdada
Mangri 
Mugu
Natharpu
Photu
Pina
Pulu
Rara
Rara Kalai 
Rowa
Ruga
Khamale
Seri
Srikot
Srinagar
Sukhadhik

References

 

 
Districts of Nepal established in 1962
Districts of Karnali Province